Colias is a genus of butterflies in the family Pieridae. They are often called clouded yellows; the North American name "sulphurs" is elsewhere used for Coliadinae in general. The closest living relative is the genus Zerene, which is sometimes included in Colias.

This genus occurs throughout the Holarctic, including the arctic regions. They are also found in South America, Africa, China and India. Their caterpillars feed on certain Fabaceae, for example vetches (Vicia). While most are thus beneficial by keeping weeds at bay, some occasionally become nuisance pests on crops like alfalfa. In some species, the wings of males have brilliant ultraviolet reflection, while those of females do not. Adults of both sexes have various colour forms.

Most if not all species of this genus, as usual for Coliadinae, do not sequester toxins or other noxious compounds from their food plants. They are therefore a well-loved prey item of insectivores as compared to Pieris of the related Pierinae. They make up this disadvantage by being more nimble and better able to evade attacks by would-be predators.

Notable lepidopterologists who did many studies on this genus included Julius Röber, J. Malcolm Fawcett, George B. Johnson and Henry Rowland-Brown.

Systematics
Hybridization runs rampant in these polytypic and clinal butterflies, confounding molecular phylogenetics studies. In general, cladistic analyses of only one type of data (particularly mtDNA sequences) cannot be considered reliable. Regardless, the evolutionary distance within some "species" is so large that cryptic speciation rather than (or in addition to) interbreeding seems to be the cause. For example, the Beringian populations traditionally assigned to the northern clouded yellow (C. hecla) could warrant recognition as a species; hybridization between North American and Asian populations seems to have played a role in their evolution, but as a whole they appear to be a rather old and distinct lineage.

Species
Listed alphabetically:
 Colias adelaidae Verhulst, 1991
 Colias aegidii Verhulst, 1990
 Colias alfacariensis Ribbe, 1905 – Berger's clouded yellow
 Colias alexandra W. H. Edwards, 1863 – Queen Alexandra's sulphur, Alexandra sulfur, or ultraviolet sulfur
 Colias alpherakii Staudinger, 1882
 Colias aquilonaris Grum-Grshimailo, 1899
 Colias arida Alphéraky, 1889
 Colias audre (Hemming, 1933)
 Colias aurorina Herrich-Schäffer, 1850 – Greek clouded butterfly or dawn clouded yellow
 Colias baeckeri Kotzsch, 1930
 Colias behrii W. H. Edwards, 1866 – Behr's sulphur or Sierra green sulfur 
 Colias berylla Fawcett, 1904 – Everest clouded yellow
 Colias canadensis Ferris, 1982 – Canada sulphur
 Colias caucasica Staudinger, 1871 – Balkan clouded yellow
 Colias chippewa W. H. Edwards, 1872 – heath sulphur
 Colias chlorocoma Christoph, 1888
 Colias christina W. H. Edwards, 1863 – Christina sulphur
 Colias christophi Grum-Grshimailo, 1885
 Colias chrysotheme (Esper, 1781) – lesser clouded yellow
 Colias cocandica Erschoff, 1874
 Colias croceus (Geoffroy, 1785) – dark clouded yellow or common clouded yellow
 Colias dimera Doubleday, 1847 – dimera sulphur
 Colias diva Grum-Grshimailo, 1891
 Colias dubia Fawcett, 1906 – dwarf clouded yellow
 Colias electo (Linnaeus, 1763) – African clouded yellow
 Colias elegans Schultz, 1904
 Colias elis Strecker, 1885 (often included in C. meadii; paraphyletic?)
 Colias eogene C. & R. Felder, 1865 – fiery clouded yellow
 Colias erate (Esper, 1805) – eastern pale clouded yellow
 Colias erschoffi Alphéraky, 1881
 Colias eurytheme Boisduval, 1852 – orange sulphur, alfalfa butterfly
 Colias euxanthe C. & R. Felder, 1865 – Puno clouded yellow
 Colias felderi Grum-Grshimailo, 1891
 Colias fieldii Ménétriés, 1855

 Colias flaveola Blanchard, 1852 – flaveola clouded yellow
 Colias gigantea Strecker, 1900 – great (northern) sulphur
 Colias grumi Alpheraky, 1897
 Colias harfordii W. H. Edwards, 1877 – Harford's sulphur
 Colias hecla Lefèbvre, 1836 – northern clouded yellow, Greenland sulphur, or hecla sulphur (paraphyletic?)
 Colias heos (Herbst, 1792)
 Colias hofmannorum Eckweiler, 2000
 Colias hyale (Linnaeus, 1758) – pale clouded yellow
 Colias hyperborea Grum-Grshimailo, 1899
 Colias interior Scudder, 1862 – pink-edged sulphur
 Colias johanseni Troubridge & Philip, 1990 – Johansen's sulphur
 Colias krauthii Klots, 1935
 Colias lada Grum-Grshimailo, 1891
 Colias ladakensis Felder & Felder, 1865 – Ladakh clouded yellow
 Colias leechi Grum-Grshimailio, 1893
 Colias lesbia (Fabricius, 1775) – Lesbia clouded yellow
 Colias libanotica Lederer, 1858 (sometimes included in C. aurorina)
 Colias marcopolo Grum-Grshimailo, 1888
 Colias marnoana Rogenhofer, 1884
 Colias meadii W. H. Edwards, 1871 – Mead's sulphur
 Colias montium Oberthür, 1886
 Colias mukana Berger, 1981
 Colias myrmidone (Esper, 1781) – Danube clouded yellow
 Colias nastes Boisduval, 1834 – Labrador sulphur
 Colias nebulosa Oberthür, 1894
 Colias nilagiriensis Felder, C & R Felder, 1859
 Colias nina Fawcett, 1904 – Fawcett's clouded yellow
 Colias occidentalis Scudder, 1862 – western sulphur or golden sulfur
 Colias palaeno (Linnaeus, 1761) – moorland clouded yellow, Arctic sulphur, palaeno sulphur or pale Arctic clouded yellow
 Colias pelidne Boisduval & Le Conte, 1829 – blueberry sulphur or pelidne sulphur
 Colias phicomone (Esper, 1780) – mountain clouded yellow
 Colias philodice Godart, 1819 – common sulphur, clouded sulphur
 Colias ponteni Wallengren, 1860
 Colias pseudochristina Ferris, 1989
 Colias regia Grum-Grshimailo, 1887
 Colias romanovi Grum-Grshimailo, 1885
 Colias sagartia Lederer, 1869
 Colias scudderii Reakirt, 1865 – willow sulphur
 Colias shahfuladi Clench & Shoumatoff, 1956
 Colias sieversi Grum-Grshimailo, 1887
 Colias sifanica Grum-Grshimailo, 1891
 Colias staudingeri Alphéraky, 1881
 Colias stoliczkana Moore, 1882 – orange clouded yellow
 Colias tamerlana Staudinger, 1897
 Colias thisoa Ménétriés, 1832
 Colias thrasibulus Fruhstorfer, 1908 – lemon clouded yellow
 Colias thula Hovanitz, 1955 – Thula sulphur
 Colias tibetana Riley, 1922
 Colias tyche (Böber, 1812) – pale Arctic clouded yellow, Arctic green sulphur, or Booth's sulphur
 Colias viluiensis (Ménétriés, 1859)
 Colias wanda Grum-Grshimaïlo, 1907
 Colias wiskotti Staudinger, 1882

Distinguishing characteristics
Colias are usually some shade of yellow, orange or white. Their uppersides feature black borders (usually solid in males, often with pale spots in females). They always perch with wings closed, but upperside pattern may be seen faintly through the wing, or glimpsed in flight.

Gallery

References

Further reading
Vladimir Lukhtanov & Alexander G. Lukhtanov, 1994 Die Tagfalter Nordwestasiens: (Lepidoptera, Diurna) V. Eitschberger 
Joseph T. Verhulst (English translation R. Leestmans, editing E. Benton and R. Leestmans), 2000 Les Colias du Globe translation Monograph of the genus Colias Keltern, Germany: Goecke & Evers 
 Glassberg, Jeffrey Butterflies through Binoculars, The West (2001)
 Guppy, Crispin S. and Shepard, Jon H. Butterflies of British Columbia (2001)
 James, David G. and Nunnallee, David Life Histories of Cascadia Butterflies (2011)
 Pelham, Jonathan Catalogue of the Butterflies of the United States and Canada (2008)
 Pyle, Robert Michael The Butterflies of Cascadia (2002)
 "Le genre Colias" provides distribution information in French.

External links

Colias images at Consortium for the Barcode of Life
Images representing Colias at Encyclopedia of Life
Euroleps via search, includes images
Rusinsects Photos and text relating to Palaearctic species
Die Gattung Colias von J. Fuchs
Oleg Kosterin Images from Siberia
 Butterflies and Moths of North America
 Butterflies of America

 
Pieridae genera
Taxa named by Johan Christian Fabricius
Coliadinae